Humphreys County is a county located in the western part of Middle Tennessee, in the U.S. state of Tennessee. As of the 2020 census, the population was 18,990. Its county seat is Waverly.

History

Humphreys County was established in 1809 from parts of Stewart County, and named for Parry Wayne Humphreys, a young Justice of the State Supreme Court, who was later elected as US Congressman from this area.  The county seat was initially located at Reynoldsburg, near the mouth of Dry Creek. When the western half of the county was taken to form Benton County to the west in 1835, the seat of Humphreys was newly designated as Waverly, a town that was more centrally located in the redefined jurisdiction.

During the Civil War, the Battle of Johnsonville was fought for two days in the western half of the county in November 1864. The remnants of the battle site are preserved and interpreted at Johnsonville State Historic Park. But much of the battlefield has been submerged by Kentucky Lake, created by dams on the Tennessee River for flood control.

Since the mid-20th century, this area developed increasing ties with the major city of Nashville. Agricultural areas have been developed for residential communities and suburban businesses. As Nashville and the region have prospered, businesses and supporting services have also developed in this county.

21st century
On the morning of August 21, 2021, storms riding along a stationary front in western Middle Tennessee produced widespread flash flooding across the counties of Stewart, Houston, Dickson, Hickman, and Humphreys. Especially hard hit were the towns of McEwen and Waverly, where many homes and businesses were destroyed by floodwaters along Trace Creek. Twenty people were killed as a result of the flooding throughout the county.

Geography

Adjacent counties
Houston County (north)
Dickson County (northeast)
Hickman County (southeast)
Perry County (south)
Benton County (west)

National protected area
Tennessee National Wildlife Refuge (part)

State protected area
Johnsonville State Historic Park

Demographics

2020 census

As of the 2020 United States census, there were 18,990 people, 6,763 households, and 4,375 families residing in the county.

2000 census
As of the census of 2000, there were 17,929 people, 7,238 households, and 5,146 families residing in the county. The population density was 33.7 people per square mile (13/km2). There were 8,482 housing units at an average density of 15.9 per square mile (6.1/km2). The racial makeup of the county was 95.52% White, 2.94% Black or African American, 0.27% Native American, 0.26% Asian, 0.01% Pacific Islander, 0.16% from other races, and 0.85% from two or more races. 0.83% of the population were Hispanic or Latino of any race.

There were 7,238 households, out of which 30.30% had children under the age of 18 living with them, 57.30% were married couples living together, 10.20% had a female householder with no husband present, and 28.90% were non-families. 25.00% of all households were made up of individuals, and 10.60% had someone living alone who was 65 years of age or older. The average household size was 2.44 and the average family size was 2.90.

In the county, the population was spread out, with 23.90% under the age of 18, 7.60% from 18 to 24, 27.50% from 25 to 44, 26.20% from 45 to 64, and 14.80% who were 65 years of age or older. The median age was 39 years. For every 100 females there were 96.80 males. For every 100 females age 18 and over, there were 93.10 males.

The median income for a household in the county was $35,786, and the median income for a family was $42,129. Males had a median income of $31,657 versus $20,736 for females. The per capita income for the county was $17,757. About 7.60% of families and 10.80% of the population were below the poverty line, including 12.50% of those under age 18 and 13.70% of those age 65 or over.

Communities

Cities
McEwen
New Johnsonville
Waverly (county seat)

Unincorporated communities
Bakerville
Buffalo
Cedar Grove
Hurricane Mills
 Hustburg
Polecat

Politics

See also
National Register of Historic Places listings in Humphreys County, Tennessee

References

External links

 Official site
 Humphreys County, TNGenWeb - free genealogy resources for the county

 
1809 establishments in Tennessee
Populated places established in 1809
Middle Tennessee